Hee-sung, also spelled Hee-seong, is a Korean unisex given name. Its meaning differs based on the hanja used to write each syllable of the name. There are 24 hanja with the reading "hee" and 27 hanja with the reading "sung" on the South Korean government's official list of hanja which may be registered for use in given names.

People with this name include:
Jung Hee-sung (born 1945), South Korean male poet
Park Hee-sung (born 1987), South Korean male football midfielder
Kwak Hee-sung (born 1990), South Korean actor
Lee Hee-seong (born 1990), South Korean male football goalkeeper
Park Hee-seong (born 1990), South Korean male football forward

Fictional characters:
 Baek Hee-sung, real name Do Hyun-soo, main character of Flower of Evil. Portrayed by Lee Joon-gi

See also
List of Korean given names

References

Korean unisex given names